Pastor Greg is a Christian sitcom, the first Christian television show of this genre. Debuted in 2005, it ran for three seasons. The series is not filmed before a studio audience and uses a laugh track.

The series was initially co-produced by Uplifting Entertainment and Cornerstone Television; when the series debuted, it was one of the first regularly scheduled religious television series to be produced in High Definition. However, to achieve this notoriety, Cornerstone added more infomercials to its schedule and cancelled some of its other programs in order to defray the cost of two HDTV cameras bought for the show. In addition, following the lead of many American series (especially dramas), production would later shift to Canada; the show's second season was filmed in Orangeville, Ontario.

Episodes

Cast
Greg Robbins as Pastor Greg
Laura Romeo as Missy (2007–2008)
Shelby Young as Lori (2005, 2008)
Jim Young as John

Other notable castmembers include Dawn Wells, Eddie Mekka, Mel Novak and Tony Nunes.

References

External links
 
 

2005 American television series debuts
2008 American television series endings
Christian entertainment television series
Trinity Broadcasting Network original programming
2000s American sitcoms
Television shows filmed in Ontario
Orangeville, Ontario
Religious comedy television series